"5,6,7,8" is a song by British group Steps from their debut studio album, Step One (1998). It is a techno-pop and country pop song written by Barry Upton and Steve Crosby, and produced by Karl Twigg, Mark Topham and Pete Waterman. It was released as their debut single in November 1997 following their being put together after each group member responded to a magazine advert looking for people to audition to be in a pop band.

"5,6,7,8" peaked at number 14 on the UK Singles Chart—one of Steps' lowest chart positions—but has become the third-best-selling single of their career in the United Kingdom, selling 365,000 copies and receiving 3,440,000 streams as of March 2017. "5,6,7,8" peaked at number-one in Australia and reached the top five in Belgium and New Zealand. Its accompanying music video was shot on a beach and features the group driving quad bikes and dancing in a bar. "5,6,7,8" was performed on The Ultimate Tour in 2012, Party on the Dancefloor Tour in 2017 and What the Future Holds Tour in 2021.

Background and release
Steps were put together in 1997 following an advert in a magazine, The Stage, asking for applicants to audition for a place in a pop band. Out of the thousands who applied, Lee Latchford-Evans, Lisa Scott-Lee, Faye Tozer, Claire Richards and Ian "H" Watkins were successful in securing a place in the band. "5,6,7,8" is a techno-pop and country pop song which was written by Barry Upton and Steve Crosby, produced by Karl Twigg, Mark Topham and Pete Waterman, and lasts for a duration of three minutes, 22 seconds. Latchford-Evans performs the majority of the song, while Scott-Lee sings the middle 8, or bridge. It was recorded at PWL Studios in Manchester, England, and mixed by Lee Sharma at the same venue. Upton also arranged the track and played the guitar, while the banjo, violin, drums and keyboards were played by Sean Lyon, Chris Haigh, Chris McDonnell and Twigg, respectively.

Al Unsworth and Bradlee Spreadborough served as the assistant engineers and it was mastered at Transfermation Studios in London, England. "5,6,7,8" features all of the band members on lead vocals except for Ian "H" Watkins, who only performs background vocals. Various versions of the song were included on the CD single in the United Kingdom, Europe and Japan, including an extended version, an instrumental and a remix by W.I.P.; the CD single in the United Kingdom and Europe also included the B-side, "Words of Wisdom", which was also written by Upton and Crosby. It was released in the United Kingdom in November 1997, and it was later included on their first greatest hits album, Gold: Greatest Hits (2001), the W.I.P. remix on their first compilation album The Last Dance (2002) and their second greatest hits album, The Ultimate Collection (2011).

Reception

Critical reception
Lucas Villa from AXS said that "5,6,7,8" "was the beginning of Steps' campy, feel good sounds." Andy Coleman from Birmingham Evening Mail described it as a "line dancing ditty". Gary James from Entertainment Focus noted that the song "stands out from the rest of their catalogue for being somewhat a novelty single." He added, "It’s blend of country, techno and pop had us reaching for our lassos and thinking perhaps Rednex had returned with a 'Cotton Eyed Joe' for 1997." Sophie McCoid from Liverpool Echo called it an "epic tune". Mark Beaumont from NME described it as a "more traditional hoedown". Peter Robinson of NME gave the song a negative review in 2001. In his review of Gold: Greatest Hits, he wrote "Steps were only signed for one single – with good reason, for '5,6,7,8' was shit of the very highest order." Similarly, Digital Spy writer Robert Copsey wrote that retrospectively, the track was a "bizarre" choice of lead single in his review of The Ultimate Collection in 2011. In a review of Steps best-selling songs for the Official Charts Company in March 2017, Copsey noted how "5,6,7,8" is distinctly different from the rest of their discography in terms of its techno-pop genre, line dancing lyrics and lack of lead vocals solely from Claire Richards.

Commercial reception
Commercially, "5,6,7,8" debuted at number 18 on the UK Singles Chart on 16 November 1997, and peaked at number 14 in its eighth week on 10 January 1998. It spent a further nine weeks on the chart from January through to March, and re-entered the chart for one week at number 100 on 18 April 1998. Altogether, "5,6,7,8" spent 18 non-consecutive weeks on the UK Singles Chart, 10 of which were in the top 20. Their first top 40 hit, "5,6,7,8" was the only song of their following fourteen singles (prior to their split in 2001) not to chart within the top 10. By July 2012, it had become it their fourth-best selling single in their career in the United Kingdom; but by March 2017 it had switched positions with one of their subsequent singles "Better Best Forgotten" to become their third-highest selling song, with sales of 365,000 copies, and is their most streamed track with 37,952,032 plays as of March 2021. It was certified platinum on 11 December 2020 for sales and streams exceeding 600,000. Copsey added that it is very rare for a pop band to be given a second opportunity to release more music following a top 20 debut.

Promotion
Set primarily on a beach, the accompanying music video for "5,6,7,8" opens with Latchford-Evans and Watkins riding quad bikes along the beach while Scott-Lee, Tozer and Richards drive a car on the road next to them, with close-ups of each of the female singers performing the chorus. It is followed by a repetition of the chorus whereby all of the members perform a line dancing routine, which was very popular at the time of its release, to the music outside a bar on the beach. Latchford, with Watkins walking slightly behind him from the beach to the bar, performs the first verse where the chorus and dance routine is once again repeated. The second verse features clips of Latchford singing while playing a game of snooker while Watkins plays on the table football. For the final chorus, the group perform the dance routine for a final time, however the setting has changed to night time and inside a different bar. The official music video has achieved 14.8 million views on YouTube as of August 2017. "5,6,7,8" was included on Steps sixth concert tour, The Ultimate Tour, in 2012. Latchford-Evans stated in March 2017 that the band does not like performing the song, but they find new ways of performing it live as they know that it is a fan-favourite. It is also included on the set list of their eighth concert tour, the Party on the Dancefloor Tour.

Formats and track listings

Album version – Step One
 "5,6,7,8" – 3:22

CD single – UK/Europe/Australia
"5,6,7,8" (Radio edit) – 3:22
"5,6,7,8" (Extended version) – 4:03
"Words of Wisdom" – 3:52
"5,6,7,8" (Instrumental) – 2:52

CD single – Japan
"5,6,7,8" (Radio edit) – 3:22
"5,6,7,8" (W.I.P. remix) – 3:15
"5,6,7,8" (Extended version) – 4:03
"5,6,7,8" (Instrumental) – 2:52

Credits and personnel

A-side: "5,6,7,8"
Credits are adapted from the liner notes of Step One.

Recording
Recorded at PWL Studios, Manchester, in 1997
Mixed at PWL Studios, Manchester
Mastered at Transfermation Studios, London

Vocals
Lead vocals – Lee Latchford-Evans
Background vocals – Ian "H" Watkins, Faye Tozer, Lisa Scott-Lee, Claire Richards

Personnel
Songwriting – Barry Upton, Steve Crosby
Production – Karl Twigg, Mark Topham, Pete Waterman
Arrangement – Barry Upton
Mixing – Lee Sharma
Engineer – Chris McDonnell
Assistant engineer – Al Unsworth, Bradlee Spreadborough
Banjo – Sean Lyon
Violin – Chris Haigh
Drums – Chris McDonnell
Guitar – Barry Upton
Keyboards – Karl Twigg

B-side: "Words of Wisdom"
Credits are adapted from the liner notes of "5,6,7,8".

Recording
Recorded at PWL Studios, Manchester, in 1997
Mixed at PWL Studios, Manchester
Mastered at Transfermation Studios, London

Vocals
Lead vocals – Faye Tozer, Lisa Scott-Lee, Claire Richards
Background vocals – Lee Latchford-Evans, Ian "H" Watkins

Personnel
Songwriting – Barry Upton, Steve Crosby
Production – Karl Twigg, Mark Topham
Arrangement – Barry Upton

Charts

Weekly charts

Year-end charts

Certifications

References

1997 songs
1997 debut singles
British synth-pop songs
Jive Records singles
Number-one singles in Australia
Songs written by Barry Upton
Steps (group) songs
UK Independent Singles Chart number-one singles
Country pop songs